Thomas Aloysius Finlay (11 October 1893 – 22 November 1932) was an Irish Cumann na nGaedheal politician and Senior Counsel who served as a Teachta Dála (TD) for the Dublin County constituency from 1930 to 1932.

In his short but varied career he had also been a District Justice and a senior official in the Department of Justice. He was elected to Dáil Éireann as a Cumann na nGaedheal TD for the Dublin County constituency at the 1930 by-election, caused by the death of Bryan Cooper of Cumann na nGaedheal. He was re-elected at the 1932 general election but died of typhoid the following November, aged 39. No by-election was held for his seat.

His children included William Finlay (1921–2010), who was a governor of the Bank of Ireland, and Thomas Finlay, who was a Chief Justice of Ireland.

References

1893 births
1932 deaths
Cumann na nGaedheal TDs
Irish barristers
Members of the 6th Dáil
Members of the 7th Dáil
Politicians from County Dublin
Deaths from typhoid fever